Craig Brian Stunkel is an electrical engineer at the IBM T.J. Watson Research Center in Yorktown Heights, New York. He was named a Fellow of the Institute of Electrical and Electronics Engineers (IEEE) in 2013 for his contributions to the design and implementation of high-performance interconnection networks.

References 

Fellow Members of the IEEE
Living people
Year of birth missing (living people)
Place of birth missing (living people)